Governor of Penza Oblast is the head of the executive branch of the government of Penza Oblast, a federal subject (an oblast) of Russia.

Election 
The procedure for the election and inauguration of the governor of Penza is determined by the federal law, the Charter of the Penza Region and the law on the election of a governor.

For the first time, the elections of the governor (head of administration) of the Penza region were held in April 1993, then were held in April 1998, and in April 2002. In December 2004, direct election of governors was abolished, instead governors were appointed by the president through the regional parliament. Thus, in May 2005 and April 2010, the Governor of the Penza Region was elected by the President of Russia and approved in the position by the Legislative Assembly. In 2012, direct elections of the heads of regions were returned, but with the condition that candidates pass through the municipal filter. According to these rules, the elections of the governor of the Penza region were held in September 2015 and September 2020.

List

Notes 

 
Penza
Politics of Penza Oblast